Exocoetus gibbosus is a species of fish in the family Exocoetidae.

References 

gibbosus
Fish described in 2000